Made-for-television films are listed separately. There is also a list of these films alphabetically.

1895–1950s
 List of LGBT-related films pre-1920
 List of LGBT-related films of the 1920s
 List of LGBT-related films of the 1930s
 List of LGBT-related films of the 1940s
 List of LGBT-related films of the 1950s

1960s
 List of LGBT-related films of 1960
 List of LGBT-related films of 1961
 List of LGBT-related films of 1962
 List of LGBT-related films of 1963
 List of LGBT-related films of 1964
 List of LGBT-related films of 1965
 List of LGBT-related films of 1966
 List of LGBT-related films of 1967
 List of LGBT-related films of 1968
 List of LGBT-related films of 1969

1970s
 List of LGBT-related films of 1970
 List of LGBT-related films of 1971
 List of LGBT-related films of 1972
 List of LGBT-related films of 1973
 List of LGBT-related films of 1974
 List of LGBT-related films of 1975
 List of LGBT-related films of 1976
 List of LGBT-related films of 1977
 List of LGBT-related films of 1978
 List of LGBT-related films of 1979

1980s
 List of LGBT-related films of 1980
 List of LGBT-related films of 1981
 List of LGBT-related films of 1982
 List of LGBT-related films of 1983
 List of LGBT-related films of 1984
 List of LGBT-related films of 1985
 List of LGBT-related films of 1986
 List of LGBT-related films of 1987
 List of LGBT-related films of 1988
 List of LGBT-related films of 1989

1990s
 List of LGBT-related films of 1990
 List of LGBT-related films of 1991
 List of LGBT-related films of 1992
 List of LGBT-related films of 1993
 List of LGBT-related films of 1994
 List of LGBT-related films of 1995
 List of LGBT-related films of 1996
 List of LGBT-related films of 1997
 List of LGBT-related films of 1998
 List of LGBT-related films of 1999

2000s
 List of LGBT-related films of 2000
 List of LGBT-related films of 2001
 List of LGBT-related films of 2002
 List of LGBT-related films of 2003
 List of LGBT-related films of 2004
 List of LGBT-related films of 2005
 List of LGBT-related films of 2006
 List of LGBT-related films of 2007
 List of LGBT-related films of 2008
 List of LGBT-related films of 2009

2010s
 List of LGBT-related films of 2010
 List of LGBT-related films of 2011
 List of LGBT-related films of 2012
 List of LGBT-related films of 2013
 List of LGBT-related films of 2014
 List of LGBT-related films of 2015
 List of LGBT-related films of 2016
 List of LGBT-related films of 2017
 List of LGBT-related films of 2018
 List of LGBT-related films of 2019

2020s 

 List of LGBT-related films of 2020
 List of LGBT-related films of 2021
 List of LGBT-related films of 2022

See also
 Alphabetical list of LGBTQ+-related films
 List of LGBTQ+-related films by storyline
 The Celluloid Closet
 Lists of American television episodes with LGBTQ+ themes
 Lists of television programs with LGBTQ+ characters
 Sexuality and gender identity-based cultures
 LGBTQ+ themes in horror fiction
 List of transgender characters in film and television

Sources
 
 

LGBT